The city of Vilnius, the capital and largest city of Lithuania, has undergone a diverse history since it was first settled in the Stone Age. Vilnius was the head of the Grand Duchy of Lithuania right until 1795, even during the Polish–Lithuanian Commonwealth. The city has changed hands many times between Imperial and Soviet Russia, Napoleonic France, Imperial and Nazi Germany, Interwar Poland, and Lithuania. It was especially often the site of conflict after the end of World War I and during World War II. It officially became the capital of independent, modern-day Lithuania when the Soviet Union recognized the country's independence in August 1991.

Grand Duchy of Lithuania

The earliest settlements in the area of present-day Vilnius appear to be of mesolithic origin. Numerous archaeological findings in different parts of the city prove that the area has been inhabited by peoples of various cultures since the early Middle Ages. Initially a Baltic settlement, later it was also inhabited by Slavs, Jews and Germans. Some historians identify the city with Voruta, a forgotten capital of King Mindaugas.

The city was first mentioned in written sources as Vilna in 1323 as the capital city of the Grand Duchy of Lithuania in the letters of Gediminas. Gediminas built his wooden castle on a hill in the city. The city became more widely known after he wrote a circular letter of invitation to Germans and Jews to the principal Hansa towns in 1325, offering free access into his domains to men of every order and profession. Gediminas founded first Dominican monastery in 1321. In the second half of the century church of St. Nicholas was erected. At this time Vilnius was facing numerous raids of the Teutonic Order, although they never captured the castle, large portions of the town were burned down in years 1365, 1377 and 1383.

Vilnius was granted city rights by Jogaila in 1387, following the Christianization of Lithuania and the construction of the Vilnius Cathedral. The town was initially populated by local Lithuanians, but soon the population began to grow as craftsmen and merchants of other nationalities settled in the city. In the 14th century, the town was marked by wooden architecture. Stone building existed only at the foot of mount Gedimas and in the surroundings of the Vokiečių gatvė (German street), where German craftsmen and merchants were housed around the Church of Saint Nicholas.

According to a tale, tired after a busy hunting day, Gediminas had a prophetic dream about an iron wolf howling on a top of the hill. When he asked a krivis (a pagan priest) Lizdeika for an explanation of the dream, he was told that he must build a castle on the top of that hill, which is strategically surrounded by three rivers (Neris, Vilnia, and Vingria (now underground)) and a grand city around that hill, so that "the iron-wolf-like sound about this great city would spread around the world". Some versions of this tale state, that for his advice, Lizdeika was given a name of Radziwiłł. The derivative of the Lithuanian name Radvila has also been interpreted as derived from Belarusian радзіць or Polish radzi 'advises'. The Lithuanian word for 'wolf' is vilkas.

English king Henry IV spent the full year of 1390 supporting the unsuccessful siege of Vilnius by Teutonic Knights with his 300 fellow knights. During this campaign, Henry Bolingbroke also bought captured Lithuanian princes and then apparently took them back to England. King Henry's second expedition to Lithuania in 1392 illustrates the financial benefits to the Order of these guest crusaders. His small army consisted of over 100 men, including longbow archers and six minstrels, at a total cost to the Lancastrian purse of £4,360. Much of this sum benefited the local economy through the purchase of silverware and the hiring of boats and equipment. Despite the efforts of Bolingbroke and his English crusaders, two years of attacks on Vilnius proved fruitless.

Between 1503 and 1522, for the sake of protection from Crimean Tatar attacks, the city was surrounded by defensive walls that had nine gates and three towers. Communities of Lithuanians, Jews, Ruthenians, and Germans were present in different areas of Vilnius. The Orthodox inhabitants concentrated in the eastern part of the city left of the "Castle Street", while most Germans and Jews occupied the western side of the city around the "German Street". The town reached the peak of its development under the reign of Sigismund II Augustus, Grand Duke of Lithuania and King of Poland, who relocated there in 1544. In the 16th century, Vilnius became a constantly growing and developing city, as Grand Duke of Lithuania and King of Poland Sigismund II Augustus and his mother queen Bona Sforza were spending much of their time in the Royal Palace of Lithuania.

The Polonization of Vilnius proceeded through the influx of Polish elements and assimilation of non-Polish burghers. It started in the late 14th century with the arrival of Polish clergy, followed by artisans and merchants; they migrated in larger numbers after the Polish court of Sigismund August moved to the city.

Polish-Lithuanian Commonwealth

After the Union of Lublin (1569) that created the Polish–Lithuanian Commonwealth, the city flourished further in part due to the establishment of Vilnius University by Stephen Báthory, King of Poland and Grand Duke of Lithuania in 1579. The university soon developed into one of the most important scientific and cultural centres of the region and the most notable scientific centre of the Grand Duchy of Lithuania. Political, economic and social life was in full swing there. This is among all proven by the Lithuanian Statutes issued in the 16th century, the last of which was still in force until the 19th century.

Rapidly developing, the city was open to migrants from both East and West. In addition to old citizens, larger Jewish, Orthodox and German communities established themselves in the city. Each group made its contribution to the life of the city, and crafts, trade and science prospered. In the 17th century, Polish and Polonized elements achieved a cultural and likely numerical preponderance.

In 1610, the city was racked by a large fire. In 1655, during the First Northern War, Vilnius was captured by the forces of Tsardom of Russia and was pillaged, burned and the population was massacred. The death toll of around 20,000 included a large proportion of Vilnius Jews. The city's growth lost its momentum for many years, yet the number of inhabitants recovered. During the Commonwealth's decline, Vilnius became known as "Jerusalem of the North" - a major religion-cultural centre of Eastern European Jewry. In 1769, the Rasos Cemetery was founded; today it is one of the oldest surviving cemeteries in the city.

Russian Empire

After the Third Partition of Poland in 1795, Vilnius was annexed by the Russian Empire and became the capital of Vilna Governorate, a part of the Northwestern Krai. In order to allow the city to expand, between the 1799 and 1805 period, the city walls were pulled down, only the Gate of Dawn (also known as Aušros vartai, Medininkų vartai or Ostra Brama, Вострая Брама) remained. In 1803 Alexander I re-established the Polish-language University. In 1812, the city was seized by Napoleon on his push towards Moscow. After the campaign's failure, the Grande Armée retreated to the area where 80,000 French soldiers died and were buried in the trenches they had built months earlier. After the November Uprising the Vilnius University was closed and repressions halted the city's further development. Civil unrest in 1861 was suppressed by the Imperial Russian Army. During the January Uprising in 1863 heavy city fights occurred, but were brutally pacified by Mikhail Muravyov, nicknamed The Hanger by the population because of the number of executions he organized. After the uprising, Polish was banned from public use. The Latin alphabet was prohibited in 1859 (Belarusian) and 1865 (Lithuanian); the ban was lifted in 1904.

During the second half of the 19th and the beginning of the 20th century Vilnius also became one of the centres of Jewish, Polish, Lithuanian and Belarusian national rebirths. According to the 1897 Russian census, by mother tongue, 40% of the population was Jewish, 31% Polish, 20% Russian, 4.2% Belarusian and 2.1% Lithuanian. Jewish culture and population was so dominant that some Jewish national revival leaders argued for a new Jewish state to be founded in the Vilnius region, with the city as its capital. These national revivals happened in Vilnius because it was one of the most tolerant, progressive and liberal places in the region, a legacy of tolerance deriving from the years of the Grand Duchy of Lithuania. One of the most important Polish, Belarusian poets and writers published their works in Vilnius at that time. It was the place where the first Belarusian weekly Nasha Niva was founded.

Vilnius became an important place of the act of the Lithuanian national revival on 4–5 December 1905, when the Great Seimas of Vilnius was held in the Palace of the present-day National Philharmonics, with over 2000 delegates from all regions of Lithuania as well as emigres. It was decided to make a demand to establish an autonomous ethnic Lithuanian state within the Russian Empire with its parliament (Seimas) in Vilnius.

Cultural life was revived after the 1905 Russian Revolution. Society of Friends of Science in Wilno was created in 1906 to practice science and literature in Polish. The Emilia and Eustachy Wróblewski Library, the centre of Polish culture, was established in 1912, around that time also Polish theatre was revived. Polish cultural life was still repressed despite its revival. In 1907 bishop Eduard von der Ropp was expelled from Vilnius to Vitebsk.

Interwar period

Polish-Lithuanian conflict

During World War I, Vilnius was occupied by Germany from 1915 until 1918. Still under German occupation, Council of Lithuania proclaimed the Act of Independence of Lithuania in Vilnius on 16 February 1918. Act proclaimed the restoration of the independent state of Lithuania with Vilnius as its capital. The German civilian administration of the Ober-Ost declined to pass full authority to Lithuania, which was not controlled by the Germans anymore. Instead, the Germans tried to control the area through promoting conflicts between local nationalities as it became clear that the German plan for the creation of Mitteleuropa, a net of satellite buffer states, failed.

Finally, on 1 January 1919, the German garrison withdrew and passed the authority over the city to a local Polish committee, against the pleas of the Lithuanian administration. A Polish administration started to be formed. Former members of the local Polish Self-Defence formations, now formally part of the Polish Army, took over the posts while the Lithuanians withdrew along with the Germans. On 5 January 1919 the city was taken by Bolshevik forces advancing from the east. Vilnius was proclaimed the capital of the Lithuanian–Byelorussian Soviet Socialist Republic. For the next 4 months the city became a communist experiment in governance. During the course of that conflict, on 19 April 1919 the city was again seized by Poland (Vilna offensive), this time by forces of the regular Polish Army. A year later, on 14 July 1920, it was lost to Soviet forces again (this time, the Soviets were aided by Lithuanians, who were promised Vilnius).

Shortly after the defeat in the Battle of Warsaw in 1920, the withdrawing Red Army handed the city over to Lithuania, following the Soviet–Lithuanian Peace Treaty of 12 July 1920. The treaty allowed for the transfer to Lithuanian authority of some part of the areas of the former Grand Duchy of Lithuania. Although the city itself, as well as its surroundings, were actually transferred, the fast pace of the Polish offensive prevented additional territories to be handed over by the Red Army and the disputed area was split into Lithuanian and Polish-controlled parts.

Many historians argue that the main reason behind the Soviet agreement with Lithuania was to weaken Poland and hand the disputed territories to a weaker state, which Lithuania was at the time, to reconquer the area more easily after the Red Army's retreat had halted. Also, the independence of the Baltic states was seen by Lenin as temporary. However, after the Battle of the Niemen River the Red Army was again defeated and Bolshevik Russia was forced to temporary abandon her plans for the reincorporation of all the lands lost by the Russian Empire in the Treaty of Brest-Litovsk.

As Russia ceased to be a major player in the area, Polish-Lithuanian relations worsened. In demographic terms Vilnius was one of the most Polonized and Russified of Lithuanian cities during 1795-1914 Russian rule, with Lithuanians constituting a mere fraction of the total population: 2% - 2,6% according to Russian (1897), German (1916) and Polish (1919) censuses. The latter two indicated that 50,1% or 56,2% of the inhabitants were Poles, while the Jewish share in the population amounted to 43,5% or 36,1% (they were conducted after a large part of the inhabitants of Vilnius were evacuated to Russia, mostly Voronezh because of war in 1915). The Lithuanians nonetheless have a strong historical claim to the city (former capital of the Grand Duchy of Lithuania, the very centre of the formation of medieval Lithuanian state) and refused to recognize any Polish claims to the city and the surrounding area. Lithuanian national activists, for example Mykolas Biržiška and Petras Klimas, supposed Poles and Belarusians in the Vilnius province to be "Slavicized Lithuanians" who, regardless of their individual preferences, must "return to the language of their blood".

After the Bolshevik armies were pushed out of the area, the line reached by the Lithuanian forces before the Poles arrived was secured and diplomatic talks started. However, the negotiations on the future of the disputed area, held under the auspice of the Conference of Ambassadors in Brussels and Paris came to a stalemate and the Polish head of state, Józef Piłsudski feared, that the Entente might want to accept the fait accompli created by the Soviet-Lithuanian Treaty of 1920. As both countries were officially at peace and the Lithuanian side rejected the idea of a plebiscite, the Poles decided to change the stalemate by creating a fait accompli for their own cause (see Polish–Lithuanian War).

On 9 October 1920, the 1st Lithuanian–Belarusian Division under General Lucjan Żeligowski seized the city in a staged mutiny. Vilnius was declared the capital of Republic of Central Lithuania, with Żeligowski as its head of state. The negotiations in Brussels continued, but the Polish move complexified the situation. Among the plans proposed by the Entente was a creation of a Polish-Lithuanian state based on a cantonal system, with shared control over the disputed area. While this was acceptable to both sides, Poland insisted on inviting the Central Lithuanian representatives to the talks. Simultaneously, the Lithuanian politicians argued that Central Lithuania was but a puppet state of Poland and rejected the idea. Finally, the talks came to yet another stalemate and no agreement was reached.

Elections in Central Lithuania

On 8 January 1922, general parliamentary elections were held in Central Lithuania. Apart from the Lithuanian, Jewish and Belarusian organisations that eventually decided to boycott the voting, Poles, who took part in it supported the incorporation of the area into Poland – with different levels of autonomy. 64.4% of the entire population took part in the voting, and as much as 80.8% of Poles. But among different ethnic groups the turnout was lower (41% of Belarusians, 15.3% Jews, 8.2% of Lithuanians and 66.2% of Tatars and Karaims). This and the frauds noted by the Chief of Military control sent by League of Nations Col. Chardigny in his report were the pretexts for Lithuania not to recognise it. Also, the Lithuanian side argued that the election area covered only the territory of Central Lithuania, that is the areas under Lithuanian administration before Żeligowski's action, while it should also cover the areas promised to Lithuania in the Soviet-Lithuanian Treaty of 1920, known as the Vilnius region.

Group of 32 Lithuanian activists, among them Mykolas Biržiška and Juozapas Kukta were deported to Lithuania on 6 February 1922, they were charged with espionage, what theoretically could be punished with death, but Polish officials just wanted to get rid of the most troublesome individuals, which anti-Polish activity was funded by the government in Kaunas.

At the Central Lithuanian Parliament session on 20 February 1922, the decision was made to annex the whole area to Poland, with Vilnius becoming the capital of the Wilno Voivodship.

The Council of Ambassadors and the international community (except for Lithuania) recognized Vilnius (Wilno) as part of Poland in 1923. The Lithuanian authorities never accepted the status quo and continued to claim sovereignty over the Region of Vilnius. Also, the city itself was declared the constitutional capital of the Lithuanian state while Kaunas was only a temporary capital of Lithuania. Lithuania closed the border and broke all diplomatic relations with Poland. The two countries remained at the de facto state of war until the Polish ultimatum to Lithuania in 1938.

Poland

Poles together with Jews, made up a majority in the city of Vilnius itself. In the years 1920–1939 Poles made up 65% of the population, Jews 28%, 4% Russians, 1% Belarusians 1% Lithuanians. Most notable cases were political imprisonment of Lithuanian cultural figures in the late 1920s: Petras Kraujalis, Pranas Bieliauskas, Kristupas Čibiras, Vincas Taškūnas, Povilas Karazija, Juozas Kairiūkštis, Vytautas Kairiūkštis, Kostas Aleksa and others, political process of May 1925, where 22 Lithuanians, that were under the threat of the death penalty, but were saved by Tadeusz Wróblewski, etc.
In 1936, a secret anti-Lithuanian memorandum was issued by the Polish administration, that discussed the measures of suppression of Lithuanian minority in Vilnius and the adjacent region, controlled by Poland.

In spite of the unfavorable geopolitical situation (which prevented the trade with the immediate neighbors of Lithuania, Germany and Soviet Russia, life in the town flourished. A new trade fair was created in 1928, the Targi Północne. A number of new factories, including modern "Elektrit" radio factory was opened. Much of the development concentrated along the central Mickiewicz Street, where the modern Jabłkowski Brothers department store was opened, equipped with lifts and automatic doors. New radio buildings and towers were erected in 1927, including the site where noted Polish poet and Nobel Prize winner Czesław Miłosz worked. The city's university was reopened under the name Stefan Batory University, and Polish was reintroduced as the language of instruction. By 1931 the city had 195,000 inhabitants, which made it the fifth-largest city in Poland. The city became an important centre of Polish cultural and scientific life, while economically the rest of the region remained relatively backward. It was claimed that this relative underdevelopment, among other issues, was the reason for difficulties with integrating the region and the city with Lithuania when it regained Vilnius in 1939.

Vilnius was also an informal capital of Yiddish at that time. The Museum of Jewish culture was founded there in 1919, and YIVO – Institute for Jewish Research, was founded there in 1924. Several important Jewish cultural institutions including theatres, newspapers and magazines, museums and schools, and Jewish PEN-Club were created before Second World War in Vilnius. Four YIVO directors emigrated to New York.

World War II

Lithuanian rule

At the beginning of the Second World War, Vilnius suffered from continuous German air raids. Despite German pressure, the Lithuanian government categorically declined the suggestions to participate in Germany's aggression against Poland. As a result of the Molotov–Ribbentrop Pact, and subsequent Soviet invasion, the territories of Eastern Poland were occupied by Red Army, which seized the city following a one-day defence on 19 September 1939. Soviet Union threatened the Lithuanian side, that the city would be incorporated into the Byelorussian SSR in case the Lithuanian side would not negotiate the future status of Vilnius according to the already prepared Soviet agenda.

After talks in Moscow on 10 October 1939, the city and its surrounding areas were transferred to Lithuania according to the Soviet–Lithuanian Mutual Assistance Treaty. In exchange, Lithuania agreed to allow Soviet military bases to be established in strategic parts of the country. Lithuanian envoys were under pressure because at the same time there were talks about attaching the entire Vilnius region to Belarusian Soviet Republic. Only one-fifth of Vilnius region was actually given back to Lithuania, even though the Soviets were recognizing the whole region as a part of Lithuania while it was still under Polish control. Polish envoy in Kaunas protested against the unlawful taking over of the city on October 13 and left Lithuania three days later, suspending with this act once again diplomatic relations between both states. This reunited Lithuanian Jews, although some people involved in Soviet activities decided to leave. In few days over 3000 Jews left Vilnius for the Soviet Union. The Lithuanian army entered Vilnius on 28 October, but it was clear for Lithuanian officials that Vilnius could not be established as a capital without proper preparation. So for the time being former prime minister Antanas Merkys was named special government representative for the city of Vilnius and Vilnius region, he was later replaced by Kazys Bizauskas.

A month of Soviet rule in Vilnius had catastrophic consequences: the city was starving, the museums and archives looted, the valuables, industry and historic documents were stolen and transferred to Russia, and many people were imprisoned or deported. Apparently, the Lithuanian government was deliberately slowing down the transfer of the capital back to Vilnius due to fears that the Soviet military presence around the city  would enable the Russians to overthrow the Lithuanian government if it were based there.

Annexation of Vilnius was greeted with rejoicing among Lithuanians, a whole generation was raised in the belief that Lithuania cannot be truly itself without the city of Vilnius, so recent events were commonly perceived as an act of historical justice. The elites were far more concerned, for many the price Lithuania paid to the Soviet Union for Vilnius was far too high, also they were aware of the demographic situation in Vilnius, and that Lithuanian rule in the city could face fierce resistance. Initially, the first encounter with the Lithuanian army and officials was calm and without any disturbance. Although the Polish bishop of Vilnius Romuald Jałbrzykowski refused to ring the bells of the city's churches. But on the very next day October 29, clashes between the Polish population, mostly students, and Lithuanian police erupted, after the Lithuanians hoisted their flag above Gediminas Tower.

After the Lithuanian army entered the town, at the end of October 1939, the demoralized Polish local population started a four-day-long anti-Jewish pogrom, in which one person lost their life and some 200 were wounded.), the Jewish community asked nearby Russian military units for intervention. The violence only stopped after a group of 35 Soviet tanks briefly re-entered the city and put an end to the pogrom. This prevented further pogroms, that were expected on the 10th–11 November, a traditional day of anti-Jewish disturbances in the city.

The Lithuanian authorities started a campaign of de-Polonization of the city, similar policies also targeted the Jews. Immediately upon entering the city, the Lithuanian authorities abolished the use of Polish złoty and ordered the currency to be converted to Lithuanian litas, with a 250% devaluation. Soon other discriminatory policies followed. During the several months-long period of retaking of Lithuanian capital, which Poles considered a Lithuanian occupation, roughly 50,000 Lithuanians (mostly officials of state ministries and their family members) came to the city.

One of the decisions made by Lithuanian authorities in this period was the closure and liquidation of the Stefan Batory University on 15 December 1939. The same decision was taken in the case of Society of Friends of Science (est. 1907), which had been permitted to function even under the oppressive Tsarist Russia rule and other Polish scientific institutions. In the process of Lithuanization Polish-language books were removed from stores and Polish street names were replaced with new ones in Lithuanian. Polish offices, schools, charitable social and cultural organizations, stores and businesses were closed. By June 1940 only two institutions in the entire city offered instruction in the Polish, while roughly 4000 Polish teachers lost their jobs. The refugees, many of whom were Poles and Jews who moved to the city to avoid being captured by the Germans, were denied free movement, and by 28 March 1940, all people who had not been citizens of the town in October 1920, were declared to be refugees. Altogether, some 12,000 people were granted Lithuanian citizenship, while 150,000 of the city's inhabitants, mostly Poles, were declared foreigners, excluded from many jobs and even prohibited from riding on trains.

Soviet occupation
The process of moving the capital was not yet finished when in June 1940, despite Lithuanian resistance, Vilnius was again seized by the Soviet Union and became the capital of the Lithuanian SSR. Approximately 35,000 – 40,000 of the city inhabitants were arrested by the NKVD and sent to gulags or deported to Siberia or Kazakhstan at that time.

German occupation
In June 1941 the city was again seized by Nazi Germany. In the old town centre, two ghettos were set up for the large Jewish population – the smaller of which was "liquidated" by October. The second ghetto lasted until 1943, though its population was regularly decimated in so-called Aktionen. A failed Jewish ghetto uprising on 1 September 1943, could not prevent its final destruction. About 95% of the local Jewish population was murdered. Many of them were among 100,000 victims of the mass executions in Paneriai, about 10 kilometres west of the old town centre. Most of the remaining 30,000 victims of the massacre were Poles – POWs, intelligentsia and members of the Armia Krajowa, which at the time was fighting against both Germans and Lithuanians.

Soviet occupation

The Germans were forced to leave Vilnius in July 1944 by the combined pressure from the Polish Home Army (Operation Ostra Brama) and the Red Army (Battle of Vilnius (1944)). In 1944–1947 the opponents of the regime included were captured, interrogated in the NKVD Palace in Lukiškės Square, executed and buried in the Tuskulėnai Manor park.

The Soviets decided that Vilnius was to become again part of the Lithuanian SSR. After the end of World War II, the Soviet government unleashed a campaign to move political views further to the Left. It demanded the transferring of Poles from the USSR and decided to transfer the Polish population from Lithuania and Belarus. This decision was soon implemented and most of the population was expelled in an operation organized by Soviet and local communist authorities. In some cases the transfer was voluntary, but not all willing people were able to leave because Poles living in rural areas were forced to remain where they had lived.

Vilnius suffered relatively little wartime damage, and most of its buildings survived the war unscathed. However, the decade after the war, both ghetto areas with the famous Great Synagogue and the northern part of German street, as well as the whole quarter on Pilies street, were torn down.

By the end of the war, only 111.000 people were left in Vilnius (before 1939 the number was circa 200.000), which had an obvious impact on the city's community and its traditions; what before the war was a Polish-Jewish city with a tiny Lithuanian minority was instantly Lithuanized, with Lithuanians becoming the new majority. Many of the remaining Poles were arrested, murdered or sent to gulags or to remote parts of the Soviet empire. These events, coupled with the policy of Russification and immigration of Poles, Russians, Belarusians from other Soviet republics during post-war years, giving rise to a significant Russophone minority, and slow but steady emigration of the surviving Jews to Israel, had a critical influence on the demographic situation of the city in the 1960s. Vilnius experienced a rapid population upsurge due to the inner migration of Lithuanians from the other parts of the country to the capital.

Independent Lithuania

Beginning in 1987 there were massive demonstrations against Soviet rule in the country. 
On 23 August 1988, 150,000-200,000 people gathered in Vilnius. On 11 March 1990, the Supreme Council of the Lithuanian SSR announced its independence from the Soviet Union and restored the independent Republic of Lithuania. The Soviets responded on 9 January 1991, by sending in troops. On January 13, during the Soviet Army attack on the State Radio and Television Building and the Vilnius TV Tower, known as the January Events, 14 people were killed and more than 700 were seriously injured. The Soviet Union finally recognized Lithuanian independence in August 1991, after the Soviet coup attempt of 1991.

The importance of Vilnius for Belarus remained at the end of the 20th century. In June 1989 Vilnius was the site of the Belarusian Popular Front conference as the Belorussian Soviet authorities would not allow the event to take place in Belarus. At the beginning of the 21st century, several institutes such as the European Humanities University and the independent sociology centre NISEPI were persecuted in Belarus by the government of Alexander Lukashenko have found an asylum in Vilnius.

In the years following its independence, Vilnius has been rapidly evolving and improving, transforming from a Soviet-dominated enclave into a modern European city in less than 15 years.

See also
 Timeline of Vilnius history
 History of Lithuania
 History of Poland
 Vilnius
 Ethnic history of the Vilnius region
 Lithuanian partisans

References

Bibliography

 Theodore R. Weeks, FROM “RUSSIAN” TO “POLISH”: Vilna-Wilno 1900–1925

 Jerzy Remer, Wilno, Poznań

External links

 Chronicles of the Vilna Ghetto: wartime photographs & documents – vilnaghetto.com
 History of Vilnius – brief history in timelines.
 Remains of Napoleon's army in Vilnius discovered
 A. Srebrakowski, The nationality panorama of Vilnius, Studia z Dziejów Rosji i Europy Środkowo-Wschodniej, Vol 55, No 3 (2020)